The 11th Houston Film Critics Society Awards nominations were announced on December 12, 2017. The ceremony was held on January 6, 2018.

Winners and nominees 
Winners are listed first and highlighted with boldface.

Movies with multiple nominations and awards

The following films received multiple nominations:

References

External links 
 Houston Film Critics Society: Awards

2017
2017 film awards
2017 in Texas
Houston